The Union of Young Fascists — Vanguard (Soyuz Yunykh Fashistov — Avangard) was a boy's youth organization of the Russian Fascist Party. It was founded in 1934 in Harbin, and was made up of Russian nationals aged between 10 and 16.

The objectives of the Union were:
 the preservation of the national identity of Russian children;
 the systematic education of Russian national spirit;
 strict observance of the Russian Orthodox faith and the old traditions of Russia;
 to act as a feeder group for membership of the senior Russian Fascist Party.

The uniform of the Vanguard was a black shirt with yellow buttons and blue epaulettes, a sword belt, and black trousers issued by the Union. Headgear was a black peaked cap with orange piping and a laurelate letter "A" emblem.

In common with the girls section 
The ideology and tactics of the Union were entirely determined by members of the Russian Fascist Party. Membership was obtained on recommendation of an existing member of the Vanguard, or a member of the senior Russian Fascist Party.

The Union was divided into two groups: Junior (10 to 13 years) and Senior (13 to 16 years). Each group was divided into two categories: Second Level (Young Fascist) and First Level (Avangardisty).

Commanding officers in the Union were the Senior Source, the Senior District Commander and Senior Divisional Commander.

The lowest structural unit in the Union was the "Focus", a group of five people. Several of these that were geographically close to each other formed a District, and together with other suburban areas or otherwise related groups, they formed a Department. The head of the group was appointed by the head of the Russian Fascist Party.

At the head of the Union Vanguard was Chief of the Vanguard, appointed by the head of the Russian Fascist Party. The other leaders were appointed on the orders of the Chief of the Vanguard.

References 
 Stephan, John J. The Russian Fascists: Tragedy and Farce in Exile, 1925-1945. 
 К. В. Родзаевский. Завещание Русского фашиста. М., ФЭРИ-В, 2001

External links
Russian Fascist Party 

Anti-communist organizations
Fascism in Manchukuo
Politics of the Soviet Union
Russian nationalist organizations
Russian Fascist Party
Youth wings of political parties in Russia
Youth organizations established in 1934
1934 establishments in China
Youth wings of fascist parties